The Rolling Stones No. 2 is the second studio album by the English rock band the Rolling Stones, released in 1965 following the success of their 1964 debut album The Rolling Stones. It followed its predecessor's tendency to largely feature American R&B and rock and roll covers. However, it does contain three compositions from the still-developing Mick Jagger/Keith Richards songwriting team.

Description
On Dutch and German pressings of the album, the title is listed as The Rolling Stones Vol. 2 on the front cover, although the back of the album cover lists the title as The Rolling Stones No. 2.

Using the cover shot for 12 X 5, the second US-released album in October 1964, The Rolling Stones No. 2s track listing would largely be emulated on the upcoming US release of The Rolling Stones, Now!. While Eric Easton was co-credited as producer alongside Andrew Loog Oldham on The Rolling Stones' debut album, Oldham takes full production duties for The Rolling Stones No. 2, which was recorded sporadically in the UK and US during 1964.

A huge hit in the UK upon release, The Rolling Stones No. 2 spent 10 weeks at No. 1 in early 1965, becoming one of the year's biggest sellers in the UK.

According to Bill Wyman in his book Stone Alone: The Story of a Rock 'n' Roll Band, John Lennon said of The Rolling Stones No. 2: "The album's great, but I don't like five-minute numbers."

Due to ABKCO's preference towards the American albums, they overlooked both The Rolling Stones and The Rolling Stones No. 2 for CD release in 1986 and during its remastering series in 2002. Consequently, the album was out of print for many years and was thus widely bootlegged by collectors.

The Muddy Waters cover "I Can't Be Satisfied" was not included on any of the band's original American albums, and was not officially released in the US until 1972 on the compilation More Hot Rocks (Big Hits & Fazed Cookies).

The Rolling Stones No. 2 was again made available to the public as part of a limited edition vinyl box set, titled The Rolling Stones 1964–1969, in November 2010 and (by itself) digitally at the same time. The original title was also re-instated as part of The Rolling Stones in Mono box set, released on 30 September 2016.

Track listing

Personnel
 Track numbers noted in parenthesis below are based on the CD track numbering.

The Rolling Stones
Mick Jagger – lead vocals , harmonica , tambourine 
Keith Richards – electric guitar , backing vocals , acoustic guitar 
Brian Jones – electric guitar , percussion , backing vocals 
Bill Wyman – bass guitar , backing vocals 
Charlie Watts – drums 

Additional personnel
Jack Nitzsche – piano 
Ian Stewart – piano , organ 
David Bailey - cover photography

Recording studios
Chess Studios, Chicago: 10–11 June & 8 November 1964 
Regent Sound Studios, London: 2, 28–29 September 1964
RCA Studios, Hollywood: 2 November 1964

Charts

References

External links
 

1965 albums
Albums produced by Andrew Loog Oldham
Decca Records albums
The Rolling Stones albums